Lampaul, meaning the llan (church) of St Paulinus or Paul Aurelian, is the name of several places in Brittany, France:

Lampaul, the principal settlement on the island of Ushant
Lampaul-Guimiliau, west of Morlaix
Lampaul-Ploudalmézeau, north west of Brest
Lampaul-Plouarzel, west of Brest